Addington Palace is an 18th-century mansion in Addington located within the London Borough of Croydon. It was built on the site of a 16th-century manor house. It is particularly known for having been, between 1807 and 1897, the summer residence of the Archbishops of Canterbury. Since the 1930s most of the grounds have been occupied by Addington Palace Golf Club. Between 1953 and 1996 the mansion was occupied by the Royal School of Church Music. It is currently used as a wedding and events venue.

History
The original manor house called Addington Place was built about the 16th century.

An ancient recipe for Malepigernout (or Dillegrout), a spiced chicken porridge, was historically made by the current Lord of the Manor of Addington to be served upon the Coronation of the Monarch of England. The Leigh family gained this serjeanty upon becoming Lords of the Manor of Addington prior to the coronation of Charles II in 1661. The Addington estate was owned by the Leigh family until the early 18th century.

Sir John Leigh died without heirs in 1737 and his estates went to distant relatives, who eventually sold to Barlow Trecothick. Trecothick had been brought up in Boston, Massachusetts, and became a merchant there. He then moved to London, still trading as a merchant, and later sat as Member of Parliament (MP) for the City of London in 1768–74, and served as Lord Mayor in 1770. He bought the estate for £38,500.

He built a new house, designed by Robert Mylne in the Palladian style; a country mansion with single-storey wings. He died before it was completed in 1774  and it was inherited by his heir, James Ivers, who had to take the surname Trecothick in order to inherit the estate. James continued the work on the house, having the substantial grounds and gardens landscaped by Lancelot "Capability" Brown. Owing to financial difficulties, James Trecothick had to sell the estate in 1802. The estate was sold in lots in 1803. The next owners (William Coles and Westgarth Snaith)  also got into financial trouble and sold it by Act of Parliament in 1807. This enabled the mansion to be purchased for the Archbishops of Canterbury, since nearby Croydon Palace had become dilapidated and inconvenient. The name became Addington Farm under the first few Archbishops, but gradually changed to Addington Palace. The archbishops made further changes and enlarged the building; work on the building was overseen by Richard Norman Shaw.

It became the official summer residence of six archbishops:
Charles Manners-Sutton (Archbishop 1805–1828)
William Howley (Archbishop 1828–1848)
John Bird Sumner (Archbishop 1848–1862)
Charles Thomas Longley (Archbishop 1862–1868)
Archibald Campbell Tait (Archbishop 1868–1882)
Edward White Benson (Archbishop 1883–1896)

All except Benson are buried in St Mary's Church or churchyard, Addington: Benson is buried in Canterbury Cathedral.

The house was sold in 1897 to Frederick Alexander English, a diamond merchant from South Africa. After his death, the mansion was taken over during the First World War by the Red Cross and became a fever hospital. Eventually, in 1930, it came into the hands of the County Borough of Croydon.

Current usage
The house was Grade II* listed in 1951. In 1953, it was leased to the Royal School of Church Music, initially to house choirboys assembled from all over Britain to sing at the Coronation of Queen Elizabeth II. The building housed the Royal School of Church Music's music publishing operation, residential college and choir school until 1996, when a private company took it over for development as a conference and banqueting venue, health farm and country club. It was used extensively for weddings until the company operating it went into liquidation in 2021.

It is surrounded by a park and golf courses, and its gardens are still largely in their original design. Much of the grounds have been leased by golf clubs and the exclusive Bishops Walk housing development was built on Bishops Walk (a private road).

A large Cedar of Lebanon stands next to the Palace, one of the Great Trees of London.

See also
Croydon Palace, the summer residence of the Archbishop of Canterbury for 500 years

References

External links

 Addington Palace – Surrey Wedding Venue & Conference Centre
 Addington Palace – Surrey Health Club & Spa
 Friends of Old Palace, Croydon, Surrey

History of the London Borough of Croydon
Houses in the London Borough of Croydon
Episcopal palaces of archbishops of Canterbury
Gardens by Capability Brown
Country houses in London
Grade II* listed buildings in the London Borough of Croydon
Grade II* listed houses in London
Houses completed in 1774